Cándido Amador Recinos (1958 - April 12, 1997)   was a Honduran political activist and Ch'orti' indigenous leader. He was General Secretary of the General  Council  of  Assessment  for  the Development  of  Indigenous  Groups (in Spanish the Comité de Asesoramiento de las Etnias  Autóctonas  de  Honduras) and had spent many years fighting to recover lost lands and for the legal possession of Ch'orti' lands for the Ch'orti' people. He was murdered by unknown assailants and left by the side of a road with determined as from a brain injury. Days earlier he had informed colleagues about death threats. Two men were arrested and later released without charge.

References

1958 births
1997 deaths
Assassinated Honduran people
Deaths by firearm in Honduras
Honduran activists
Indigenous activists of the Americas
Indigenous rights activists
People murdered in Honduras
1997 murders in North America